KLMR (920 kHz) is a radio station which is currently silent, but previously broadcast a news/talk format. Licensed to Lamar, Colorado, United States, the station is owned by Aaron Leiker through licensee 25-7 Media, Inc., and featured programming from Westwood One.

The station signed on in December 1948. Originally operating at 1340 kHz, KLMR moved to 920 kHz in 1955.

On June 11, 2018, KLMR changed its format from classic country to news/talk/sports.

The station's studio and transmitter was destroyed by a microburst on July 23, 2022. 25/7 Media elected not to rebuild the station, and surrendered the licenses of KLMR and sister station KLMR-FM to the FCC on September 21, 2022. That October, the licenses were reinstated, with 25/7 Media instead requesting special temporary authority to keep the stations silent for financial reasons.On January 2, 2023, it was announced that 25/7 Media had sold KLMR and KLMR-FM to Riverside Communications LLC for $30,000. Riverside plans to rebuild the stations and return them to operational status, with a tentative launch date of early 2023.

Previous logo

References

External links

FCC History Cards for KLMR

LMR (AM)
Radio stations established in 1948
1948 establishments in Colorado